Mohammad Eqbal Munib was a Hazara politician and the former governor of Ghor. Before that he had been governor of Sar-e Pol.

As governor of Sar-e Pol Mohammad Eqbal Munib survived two attempts on his life. One was on 24 April 2007, a "mine planted near a brook" which was remotely detonated by unidentified people as Munib's car was passing by. The blast damaged the vehicle but did not cause any casualties. No one has claimed responsibility for the attack.

In May 2010 the provincial council of Ghor Province and some civil society organizations wrote a letter to President Hamid Karzai wherein they criticized the performance of Mohammad Eqbal Munib and asked for the dismissal of the governor. Following this, Governor Munib was dismissed by the president due to lack of professionalism.

On 14 July 2012, he was killed in a suicide blast during a wedding party in Samangan, Samangan Province.

Notes 

2012 deaths
Hazara politicians
Assassinated Afghan politicians
Governors of Ghor Province
Governors of Sar-e Pol Province